Bhaswar Chattopadhyay or Bhaswar Chatterjee (born 8 March 1975) is a Bengali film and television actor. He attended high school at South Point School and graduated in bioscience from Asutosh College. Before getting his first job in GlaxoSmithKline Pharmaceuticals in 1996, he obtained a diploma in marketing and sales management from Bharatiya Vidya Bhavan.

In 1998, his first appearance on television was in Jaltaranga followed by Bishnu Pal Chowdhury's Kanakanjali. Chatterjee established himself in the Bollywood industry with The Legend of Bhagat Singh in 2002 by playing Batukeshwar Dutt, and with the daily soap Janmobhumi in 2003. , he has appeared in 57 daily soaps and a total of 111 serials in the Bengali language. 

He was a member of Indian censor board from 2014 to 2017.

Early life
He was a student of South Point School for his high school years, and graduated in bioscience from Asutosh College. Before getting his first job in GlaxoSmithKline Pharmaceuticals in 1996, he obtained a diploma in marketing and sales management from Bharatiya Vidya Bhavan.

Family
Bhaswar's great grandfather, the late Bhimchandra Chatterjee, though an electrical engineer, was the architect of the Benares Hindu university (on insistence of the late Madan Mohan Malviya).  His Elements of applied electricity books were in circulation a few years back. He was the Head of the Department of Electrical Engineering at Benaras Hindu University in 1936.

Though he belongs to a family of four generations of engineers, he always wanted to be an actor.  Probably his acting genes comes from his mother's side whose uncle Devi Mukherjee was a star actor in the 1940s.

Filmography and television
Some of the major daily soaps featuring Chattopadhyay which garnered high "TRPs" (ratings) are Joy Baba Loknath, Shree Krishna Bhakto Meera, as well as:

OTT
Bhaswar also is being active on ott platforms like Hoichoi ,he did the successful Paap season 1&2 and Six and Addatimes where he was seen in The Adventures of Gogol. His upcoming ott release is Raktakarabi for Zee5 streaming from 3rd February.

Films

Television

Philanthropy
Bhaswar Chatterjee runs an NGO, "Aparna Foundation" in his mother's name, which assists the poor and needy.  The foundation started collecting used clothes and accessories and distributed them to different parts of Kolkata and its outskirts. Later in 2021 during pandemic, it worked extensively in Kolkata where it fed the pavement dwellers for continuous 22 days along with Puri, Katra and specially Kashmir.The Ngo supplied a month’s ration to ghorawalas and pitthuwalas of Vaishnodevi Temple, to the houseboat caretakers in Srinagar, helped in marriage of a Kashmiri girl, build a house for a poor family. It also helps a number of girl children with studies in Kashmir.

Notes

References

External links 

Male actors in Bengali cinema
Bengali male television actors
Living people
Asutosh College alumni
University of Calcutta alumni
1975 births